Star Wars is a 2017-2018 Indian-Tamil-language Celebrity Couples stunt/dare reality-comedy game show, based on the American Fear Factor. It aired on Sun TV from 5 November 2017 to 17 June 2018 on every Sunday at 12:00PM (IST) for 32 Episodes. The Contestants of is popular Television and Film artist and Hosted by Abi and Kathir in the first season and Abi and Vikram in the second season.  The Show first season winners are Nancy Jennifer and Ramakrishnan and the second season winners are Nimmi and Aravind.

The second season has been started from 18 February 2018,  with 8 new Television and Film artist. The second season hosted by Vikiram and Abi.

Seasons overview

Season 1

Winners

Celebrities
 Shwetha Bandekar: is a Tamil television actress, who had appeared in Tamil serial on television like Chandralekha and Lakshmi Vandhachu.
 Abhinayashree: is an Indian actress who has appeared in South Indian regional language films like Friends, Thathi Thavadhu Manasu, Uu Kodathara? Ulikki Padathara?.
 Teju (Shyamili): is a Tamil television and film actress, who had appeared in Tamil serial on television like Romapuri Pandian and Vani Rani.
 Niharika
 Aarthi: an actress who has primarily appeared as a comedienne in Tamil films.
 Ganeshkar: an actor who has primarily appeared as a comedienne in Tamil films.
 Nancy Jennifer: an actress who has appeared in supporting roles for the films, Ghilli (2004) and serials, Thayumanavan (2013–14) and Keladi Kanmani (2015-2017).
 Ramakrishnan:  is a Tamil film actor, best known for playing leading role in Kunguma Poovum Konjum Puravum (2009)
 Vijay: an television actor, best known for playing main role in Priyamanaval and EMI Thavanai Murai Vazhkai.
 Sivaranjani: a television actress, who has appeared in leading roles in television Mohini (2014-2015), Arangetram (2014) and Priyamanaval.
 Nagashree

Team

Season 2

Celebrities
 Nancy Jennifer: an actress who has appeared in supporting roles for the films, Ghilli (2004) and serials, Thayumanavan (2013–14), Keladi Kanmani (2015-2017) also title winner is Star war season 1.
 Ramakrishnan:  is a Tamil film actor, best known for playing leading role in Kunguma Poovum Konjum Puravum (2009) and title winner is Star war season 1.
 Shanthini: is a Tamil Television Actress, who had appeared in Tamil Serial on television like Sumangali and Apoorva Raagangal.
 Black Pandi: is a Tamil comedy actor.
 Pavithiran: is a Tamil television actor, who had appeared in the TV series Kula Deivam.
 Nimmy: an actress.
 Shalu Shamu: a Tamil film actress, who had appeared in 2013 Tamil Film Varuthapadatha Valibar Sangam.
 Aravind: is a Tamil Television Actor, who had appeared in Tamil Serial on television like Pasamalar and Ganga.
 Shwetha: is a Tamil Television Actress, who had appeared in Tamil Serial on television like Karthigai Pengal and Apoorva Raagangal.
 Shanthini Deva: an actress who has appeared in 2009 Tamil Film Naadodigal.

Team

International broadcast
The Series was released on 5 November 2017  on Sun TV, the show also airs on Sun TV HD. The Show was also broadcast internationally on Channel's international distribution. 
 It airs in Sri Lanka, South East Asia, Middle East, United States, Canada, Europe, Oceania, South Africa and Sub Saharan Africa on Sun TV and Sun TV HD.
 The episodes are also available on Sun NXT.
 It is also available via the internet protocol television service, Lebara Play,  Lyca TV and YuppTV.

References

External links 
 Official Website 
 Sun TV on YouTube
 Sun TV Network 
 Sun Group 

Sun TV original programming
Tamil-language reality television series
2010s Tamil-language television series
2017 Tamil-language television series debuts
Tamil-language television shows
2018 Tamil-language television series endings